The 1970 Virginia Slims of Richmond  was a women's tennis tournament played on indoor clay courts at the Westwood Racquet Club in Richmond, Virginia in the United States. It was the inaugural edition of the tournament and was held from November 5 through November 8, 1970. It was the second Virginia Slims tournament after the 1970 Houston Women's Invitation in September and was not sanctioned by the United States Lawn Tennis Association (USLTA). First-seeded Billie Jean King won the singles title and earned $2,400 first-prize money.

Finals

Singles
 Billie Jean King defeated  Nancy Richey 6–3, 6–3

Doubles
 Rosie Casals /  Billie Jean King defeated  Mary-Ann Curtis /  Valerie Ziegenfuss 6–4, 6–4

Prize money

References

1970 in sports in Virginia
Virginia Slims of Richmond
March 1970 sports events in the United States